Cattin & Cie SA, Montres CATOREX is a Swiss watch manufacturer started in 1858 by Constant Cattin, in Les Breuleux in the canton of Jura in Switzerland.

History 
In the early 19th century the farmer-watchmaker, Georges Ignace Cattin (born 1785) started manufacturing pocket watches with cabinotiers in the canton of Jura, Switzerland. Georges Ignace Cattin became the first in a line of master watchmakers. His son, Constant Cattin, born in 1818, founder of Cattin & Cie SA in 1858 in Les Breuleux, where the company is still based today. The company was then directed by Numa Cattin in 3rd generation, born in 1861, Armand and Maurice Cattin (4th generation, born in 1885 and 1887 respectively) and Guy Cattin in 5th generation, born 1932 and father of Guy Albert Cattin, the current owner. CATOREX was created an registered as a trade mark in 1957 by the present owner's father in response to requests from niche players who appreciated the company's price-quality ratio.

References

Further reading

External links 
 

Companies established in 1858
Swiss watch brands
Watch manufacturing companies of Switzerland
Canton of Jura